Elysia was an American deathcore band from Shingle Springs, California. Originally called Elysium's Revenge, the band was started in 2003 while the members were in high school. Since 2003, they have released two EPs and one full-length album, and have completed two US tours despite almost constant line-up changes. Having settled into a more solid line-up, the band released Lion of Judas, on June 10, 2008, through Ferret Records. The band disbanded in 2008, but announced their reformation in 2013.

They have toured and performed with acts like Arsonists Get All the Girls, Knights of the Abyss, Catherine, Emmure, Heavy Heavy Low Low, Impending Doom, Killwhitneydead, Suicide Silence and This Is Hell. They also have performed at the Saints & Sinners Festival in 2007.

History

Formation and early years
Elysia started as Elysium's Revenge, while the band members were still in high school. The band gained notoriety in the Shingle Springs-Cameron Park area with their empty shows at the Shingle Springs Community Center. By the end of 2003, they shortened their name to Elysia and added a second vocalist, Justin Chambers, who helped them record their first EP. Months later, they penned "Incinerate", a song that has grown to become a staple in their setlist. In the spring of 2004 they recorded a second EP with the first occurrence of "Incinerate". The release show for this EP features Suffokate and The Frontline. That summer and fall, they would write "Triumph" and "Filthy".

Masochist
Out of the Masochist writing sessions came their first full album, Masochist. Originally planned to be released on the  This City Is Burning Records, problems arose and it became a DIY effort. It was during this time that they started to become more known, touring with killwhitneydead. Around this time, most of the band graduated, and Kevin Marquez left the band to move to San Diego. After several band member changes, they toured along the west coast. In the spring of 2007, the band planned to rerecord the album for a re-release on Tribunal Records, with Jamie King as the producer. However, Joey Rommel, drummer at the time, left the band right before they went into Castle Ultimate Studios for the recording. Due to this they never re-released the album, although they are on a Tribunal Records sampler.  They found drummer Jacob Durrett (now playing drums in Fate) to fill in for a 10 Day tour with Impending Doom and Moria. After returning home they found Steven Sessler to play drums, who is still a member of the band. Alex Porte left the band in the summer of 2007, less than a month before their first full US tour. With Zak Vargas the sole original member, the band almost broke up, but continued due to contractual obligations to perform. They toured with Knights of the Abyss and Arsonists Get All the Girls, and during the tour got jumped for a second time. In the low point of the band, when they were about to break up, Elysia got signed to Ferret Records. Elysia signed into a three-day mini-tour, and the day it started Mark Underwood, Alex's replacement, leaves the band. Once again, the fate of the band was at stake, but Zak agreed to continue and they found a replacement guitarist. To save the band, after the mini-tour Zak talked Garrett Gilardi, a highschool friend, into joining the band again, as well as Jon joining the band again as the bassist.

Lion of Judas
In December of 2007, the band sat down to write their second album, Lion of Judas released through Ferret Records. They consider their new music to be "a new era for Elysia, so please do not expect the same band." They were on a tour with This Is Hell, where it concluded with a trip to Salem, Massachusetts where the new album was recorded with Kurt Ballou for a week. They dropped off the tour with Shai Hulud and Full Blown Chaos because of medical issues with Zak.

Disbanding and re-forming
After the drop-out of the last tour, there were hints of Elysia's then current state including their MySpace design removed and Zak's blog entries which included Elysia breaking up. Members including Zak, Steven, and Garrett looked into working together on a new project but nothing surfaced.

Through many sources, it was confirmed the band had reformed. Plans fell through with the other members, thus putting to rest of any plans of reformation. Zak Vargas would later form black metal outfit VRTRA.

Musical style
Elysia's lyrics cover a wide range of topics, such as homophobia and failed romantic love. The band admits that they sometimes have a hard time accurately portraying the meanings they want to put across, mainly because of "immaturity". For example, the lyrical content of "Incinerate" and "Filthy" has had the band criticized. They have also been banned from playing at venues because of their lyric's graphic violent content. Their sound has encompassed several facets of hardcore and metal.  Their early material, to include Masochist, was of the deathcore style.  Their second and final album, Lion of Judas, was of a style reminiscent of 90s hardcore in its sound; however it continued the band's socially minded lyrical themes, albeit in a more seasoned manner.

The band's first studio album Masochist pulls heavily on metalcore and death metal influence (the two genres that make up deathcore). Although with breakdowns inspired directly from 90's hardcore rather than the typical metalcore breakdown. Some of the band's influences include Entombed, Immolation, Dying Fetus, The Acacia Strain, Converge and Pantera.

Band members

Final line-up
Zak Vargas – vocals 
Alex Porte – guitars 
Mark Underwood – guitars 
Danny Lomeli – guitars (2006-2007) drums 
Chris Lemos– bass guitar, backing vocals 

Former members
Justin Chambers – keyboard, vocals 
Andre Vocino – guitar 
Pat Guild – bass 
John Sontag - bass 
Kevin Marquez – drums 
Joey Rommel – drums 
Chris Cain– guitar  
Jeremy Chavez – bass 
Garrett Gilardi - guitar 
Jon Malanowski – bass, backing vocals 
Steven Sessler – drums 

Timeline

Discography

As Elysia
Studio albums
Masochist (2006)
Lion of Judas (2008)

EPs
Killing Grounds EP (2004)
Tease Her, Please Her, Stick Her in the Freezer (2005)

Demos
Demo (2003)
04 Demo (2004)

As Elysium's Revenge
EPs
Demo (2003)

References

American deathcore musical groups
Death metal musical groups from California
Ferret Music artists
Musical groups established in 2003
Musical groups disestablished in 2008
Musical quintets
Metalcore musical groups from California